Discovery Turbo is an Indian male-oriented factual television channel devoted to programming regarding cars, bikes, boats, and planes. The channel is owned by Warner Bros. Discovery India. The channel was launched in January 2010, and was later converted into a men's only channel on 1 December 2014.

Programming
 A Bike is Born
 The AA Torque Show
 Air Dogs
 Airplane Repo
 American Icon: The Hot Rod
 American Chopper
 American Hot Rod
 American Trucker
 Auto Trader
 Bangla Bangers
 Beetle Crisis
 Biker Build-Off
 British Biker Build-Off
 Campervan Crisis
 Car Crazy Central
 Car Science
 Carfellas
 Chasing Classic Cars
 Chop Shop: London Garage
 Classic Car Club
 Dallas Cars Sharks
 Desert Car Kings
 Drift Style
 Engineering The World Rally
 Extreme Car Hoarders
 Extreme Machines
 FantomWorks
 Fast N' Loud
 Fat N' Furious: Rolling Thunder
 Fifth Gear
 FlightPathTV
 Flying Heavy Metal
 The Garage
 Getting Afloat
 The Great Biker Build-Off
 Hard Shine
 Heartland Thunder
 High Tech Rednecks
 Hot Rod TV
 I Could Do That
 In a Fix
 Inside West Coast Customs
 Kings of Crash
 Kit: An Autobody Experience
 Kustomizer
 Last Car Standing
 Martin Shaw: Aviators
 Mean Green Machines
 Million Dollar Auctions
 Motor City Motors
 Motor Morphers
 Monster Garage
 Off Limits
 Off The Road
 Overhaulin'
 Patrick Dempsey: Racing to Le Mans
 Pit Crews
 Playing Parking Only
 Racer Girls
 Railroad Alaska
 Redline TV
 Restoration Garage
 Retro Car Kings
 Rides
 The Road to Le Mans
 The Secret Club of Speed
 The Secret Life of Formula One
 Street Customs
 Top Marques
 Thunder Races
 Trick My Truck
 Trick My What?
 Twist the Throttle
 Ultimate Biker Challenge
 Ultimate Car Build-Off
 Unique Whips: Special Edition
 What's in the Barn?
 Wheeler Dealers
 Wrecked
 Wreck Rescue
 Wrecks to Riches

References

Warner Bros. Discovery networks
Television channels and stations established in 2010
English-language television stations in India